Draba lemmonii is a perennial plant in the family Brassicaceae found in the high elevation United States Sierra Nevada range, commonly known as Lemmon's draba.

Growth pattern

Habitat and range
It grows in crevices, talus, and rocky meadows of the subalpine forest and alpine zone of the United States Sierra Nevada range.

Leaves and stems

Inflorescence and fruit
The flower stalk has up to 30 small, yellow, 4 petalled flowers on top in July of August.

References

lemmonii
Flora of the Sierra Nevada (United States)
Flora without expected TNC conservation status